These are the official results of the Women's 100 metres event at the 2001 IAAF World Championships in Edmonton, Canada.

Medalists

Results

Heats
First 3 of each Heat (Q) and the next 8 fastest (q) qualified for the quarterfinals.

Wind:Heat 1: -0.9 m/s, Heat 2: +0.1 m/s, Heat 3: -0.5 m/s, Heat 4: -1.3 m/s, Heat 5: -0.6 m/s, Heat 6: -0.2 m/s, Heat 7: +0.6 m/s, Heat 8: -0.2 m/s

Quarterfinals
First 3 of each Heat (Q) and the next 4 fastest (q) qualified for the semifinals.

Wind:Heat 1: 0.0 m/s, Heat 2: -3.4 m/s, Heat 3: +0.8 m/s, Heat 4: -1.3 m/s

Semifinals
First 4 of each Semifinal qualified directly (Q) for the final.

Wind:Heat 1: -2.3 m/s, Heat 2: +0.3 m/s

Final
Wind: -0.3 m/s

References
 Finals Results
 Semi-finals results
 Quarter-finals results
 Heats results

H
100 metres at the World Athletics Championships
2001 in women's athletics